Joyce Juanita Sylvester (born 19 September 1965) is a Dutch politician and administrator. A member of the Labour Party (PvdA), she served as a member of the Senate from 2003 to 2015.

Early life, education and professional life 
Sylvester was raised in a family with 3 sisters. Her parents had emigrated from Surinam to the Netherlands early 60s. Her mother was managing caretaker of the Amsterdam mayoral residence. After completing her secondary education, Sylvester studied both Communication and Information Management at Utrecht University and Political Science at the University of Amsterdam. She obtained her PhD in 2000 from the faculty of law of the VU University of Amsterdam with a doctoral dissertation on “Privatization in Practice”. After her studies she worked as a journalist for the newspaper Het Parool, at Migrant Television Amsterdam, as financial policy officer at the Dutch Ministry of Transport and as a civil servant with the municipality of Amsterdam. After obtaining her PhD she worked in the private sector.

End 2019 she appeared in the list of the Volkskrant Top 200 Most Influential Dutch People.

Public service 

In 2003 Sylvester was elected as a senator in the Parliament of the Netherlands, representing the Dutch Labour Party. In the Senate, she engaged in finance, economic affairs, culture, and agriculture. In the senate elections of 2007, she kept her seat on the basis of preference votes. In 2011 she was in ninth place on the candidate list and was reelected again. As senator she acted as secretary of the Labour Party Senate faction, chair of the Senate Committee on Social Affairs and Welfare, and deputy chair of the Senate Committee on Foreign Affairs and General Affairs.

From October 1, 2008 to May 31, 2009 she was appointed as acting mayor of the town of Anna Paulowna, in the province of North Holland, replacing the outgoing mayor Arnoud-Jan Pennink. Joyce Sylvester was the first black woman in the Netherlands taking on this role. In September 2009 Sylvester was appointed as acting mayor of the town of Naarden until its amalgamation to the new municipality Gooise Meren in January 2016.

Since February 1, 2016 Sylvester is working as delegate ombudsman at the Dutch High Council of State National Ombudsman.

Sylvester holds various other positions. She is, inter alia, chairperson of the board of trustees of the Foundation Early Music Utrecht, member of the supervisory board of the “Stedelijk Museum” of Amsterdam and chairperson of the Foundation of Cooperating Relief Agencies, which in the Netherlands is known by its colloquial name Giro555.

Publications 

Joyce Sylvester wrote several books:

 Joyce Sylvester, "De praktijk van privatisering: dissertatie" (2000)
 Joyce Sylvester i.s.m. Jan Jurriens, "Strategievorming van verzelfstandigde organisaties" (2001)
 H.J. de Ru, J.A.F Peters, J.J. Sylvester, "Monografieën Overheid en Markt, De Wet markt en overheid, beschouwingen over een omstreden wetsvoorstel", (2003), SDU Uitgevers BV, Den Haag,

References
 http://afroeurope.blogspot.nl/2009/09/joyce-sylvester-dutch-black-mayor.html

External links
 

1965 births
Living people
Dutch people of Surinamese descent
Labour Party (Netherlands) politicians
Mayors in North Holland
Members of the Senate (Netherlands)
Politicians from Amsterdam
University of Amsterdam alumni
Utrecht University alumni
Vrije Universiteit Amsterdam alumni
Women mayors of places in the Netherlands